Pseudopostega subtila is a moth of the family Opostegidae. It was described by Donald R. Davis and Jonas R. Stonis, 2007. It is known from the state of Minas Gerais of south-eastern Brazil.

The length of the forewings is about 3.8 mm. Adults have been recorded in December.

Etymology
The species name is derived from the Latin subtilis (meaning thin, slender, acute) in reference to the elongate, slender, caudal lobe of the male gnathos.

References

Opostegidae
Moths described in 2007